Stuart Kleinfelder from the University of California, Irvine was named Fellow of the Institute of Electrical and Electronics Engineers (IEEE) in 2016 for contributions to sensors and instrumentation for high-speed imaging applications.

References

Fellow Members of the IEEE
Living people
Year of birth missing (living people)
Place of birth missing (living people)
University of California, Irvine faculty
American electrical engineers